Tariq Al-Shahrani (born 14 February 2000) is a Saudi Arabian professional footballer who plays as a midfielder for Pro League side Abha.

Career
Al-Shahrani started his career at the youth teams of Abha. He was first called up to the first team after the 2019–20 season resumed following the COVID-19 pandemic. He made his first-team debut on 12 August 2021 in the 2–1 win against Al-Shabab.

References

External links
 
 

Living people
2000 births
Association football midfielders
Saudi Arabian footballers
Abha Club players
Saudi Professional League players